Sisyphus is the debut studio album by Sisyphus, a collaborative project between Serengeti, Son Lux, and Sufjan Stevens. It was released through Asthmatic Kitty on March 18, 2014. The project was commissioned by the Walker Art Center and the Saint Paul Chamber Orchestra's Liquid Music series to accompany an exhibition of the work of visual artist Jim Hodges, scheduled to run from February 14 through May 11, 2014.

Music videos were made for "Calm It Down", "Alcohol", "Booty Call", and "Take Me".

Critical reception

At Metacritic, which assigns a weighted average score out of 100 to reviews from mainstream critics, the album received an average score of 64, based on 17 reviews, indicating "generally favorable reviews."

Jeremy D. Larson of Pitchfork gave the album a 6.2 out of 10, saying: "More often than not, Sisyphus misses its mark, but the album's dense, melancholy back half represents its strongest moments." Meanwhile, Paul MacInnes of The Guardian gave the album 4 stars out of 5, saying: "Even when the fusion doesn't work, you can't help but admire the creativity."

Track listing

Personnel
Credits adapted from liner notes.

Sisyphus
 Serengeti – performance
 Son Lux – performance
 Sufjan Stevens – performance

Additional musicians
 Rob Moose – strings (5)
 DM Stith – vocals (8)
 Christopher Wray – guitar (8), bass guitar (8)
 Rafiq Bhatia – guitar (10)

Technical personnel
 Jim Hodges – artwork
 Stephen Halker – Sisyphus logo
 David Regen – back cover photography
 Ronald Amstutz – interior photography

Charts

References

External links
 
 

2014 debut albums
Collaborative albums
Sisyphus (hip hop group) albums
Asthmatic Kitty albums
Albums produced by Sufjan Stevens